Nagraj Popatrao Manjule (Marathi pronunciation: [naɡɾaːd͡ʒ maɲd͡ʒuɭeː]; born 24 August 1978) is an Indian film director, actor, producer, scriptwriter, poet, screenwriter, filmmaker and he works in the Marathi Cinema, best known for his Marathi film Sairat, short-film Pistulya for which he received National Film Award in Non-Feature Film category.

At the 61st National Film Awards, Fandry won the Indira Gandhi Award for Best Debut Film of a Director. In 2018, Manjule published a book of poetry in Marathi titled Unhachya Katavirudhha which won the Bhairuratan Damani Sahitya Puraskar. He owns a wrestling team called 'Veer Marathwada' in Zee Maharashtra Kusti Dangal.

Early life and education 
Manjule grew up in Jeur village in the Solapur district of Maharashtra. He belongs to the traditionally-nomadic Waddar community, a Dravidian tribe.

He earned his M.A. in Marathi literature from University of Pune, followed by a master's in communication studies from New Arts, Science and Commerce College, Ahmednagar.

Career 
Manjule is strongly inspired by Dr. B. R. Ambedkar, the emancipator of downtrodden and the father of the Indian constitution. His films are deeply rooted in his own experience growing up as a dalit in rural Maharashtra. His films have focused on the plights faced by members of these communities, including social discrimination at the hands of high-caste communities as well as the resulting economic hardships.

His first National Award-winning short film Pistulya is a reflection of his 'felt experience'. The film focuses on the desire of a dalit boy to attend school, and his inability to do so because of his family's poverty and a deep-seated disdain for formal education within his community.

His debut feature film, Fandry, was released in February 2014; the word means "pig" in the Kaikadi language.

Manjule's second film, Sairat, premiered at the 66th Berlin International Film Festival. Like Fandry and Pistulya, it deals with caste discrimination and honour killing, a practice still widespread in parts of India. Sairat also seeks to address the role of women in society, with the character of Archie (Archana Patil), the female protagonist of Sairat, garnering both popular and critical acclaim. Sairat is currently the highest grossing Marathi film of all time. Manjule made his directorial debut in Hindi films with Jhund starring Amitabh Bachchan.

In 2019, Manjule hosted Marathi Kaun Banega Crorepati.

Filmography

Books 
 Unhachya Kataviruddha – poetry.

Awards

References

External links 
 
 
 

Film directors from Maharashtra
Living people
Marathi film directors
Indian male screenwriters
People from Solapur district
Savitribai Phule Pune University alumni
Marathi-language poets
Indian male poets
Poets from Maharashtra
Director whose film won the Best Debut Feature Film National Film Award
1977 births